Chironeura chrysocyma is a moth in the family Xyloryctidae, and the only species in the genus Chironeura. Species and genus were both described by Alexey Diakonoff in 1954 and are found New Guinea.

References

Xyloryctidae
Xyloryctidae genera
Monotypic moth genera
Taxa named by Alexey Diakonoff